Kochubey was a Crimean Tatar family of the Cossack Hetmanate and later the Russian Empire. Over the years many representatives of the family held high government positions.

Notable family members 
 Vasyl Kochubey (1640 - 1708), Chancellor of Zaporizhian Host, Judge General in Cossack Hetmanate
 Viktor Kochubey (1768-1834), a Russian minister of foreign affairs and minister of interior

See also 
 Skoropadsky family

External links

 Volodko, V. Ukrainians who created the empire. Ukrayinska Pravda. 5 July 2011
 Dudar, O. From Kuchuk-bey to Kochubey. Pohlyad. 4 June 2013
 Yaresko, M. Descendant of Kochubey: We have kept the main thing - loyalty to Orthodoxy and faith in God. UNIAN. 1 April 2013

References

Crimean Tatar people
Russian noble families
Ukrainian noble families